Rabat Ajax Football Club is a Maltese football club based in Rabat. The last promotion to the Maltese Premier League was achieved in the 2011–12 season, when they earned promotion after finishing second behind Melita. In the 2020-21 National Amateur League season, the club finished 4th in group B, qualifying for the promotion playoffs. After beating Msida St. Joseph and Marsaskala in the quarter and semi finals respectively, they reached the final against Kirkop United. The Magpies won the final 2-1, securing themselves the fourth and final promotion spot to the following seasons Challenge League.

History
1930: Club founded with the name Rabat Rovers
1937: Joined with Rabat Rangers and Old City to form Rabat Zvanks
1938: Club was renamed to Rabat FC
1980: Joined with Rabat Ajax to form Rabat Ajax FC
1983: First participation in a European Cup (C3) (1983/84 season)
1985: Rabat Ajax win The Maltese Championship
1986: Rabat Ajax win The Maltese Championship and Maltese Cup

Honours
Maltese Premier League
Champions : 1984–85, 1985–86
Maltese FA Trophy
Winners: 1985–86
Finalists: 1953–54
Maltese Super Cup
Winners : 1985, 1986
Maltese First Division
Champions : 1950/51, 1961/62, 1981–82, 1989/90, 1997/98

UEFA Cups qualifiers
In 1983–84 Rabat Ajax met Czechoslovak side Inter Bratislava in the UEFA Cup, where following a 0–10 dumping at home, they also lost 0–6 in the return leg in Bratislava. The following year Rabat Ajax also played in the UEFA Cup, where it met Yugoslav side Partizan Belgrade, with whom it lost both matches with a 0–2 scoreline.

Rabat Ajax has played four qualification matches in the European Cup. In 1985–86 they lost twice a 5–0 score against Cypriot side AC Omonia. In 1986–87 they were trounced 9–0 by eventual winners FC Porto at the Rio Ave stadium in Vila do Conde and 1–0 at home in Malta.

Rabat Ajax in Europe

Players

Current squad

Out on loan

Board & Management 2020/21

Notable former managers

 Paddy Sloan (1954 – 1955)
 Joe A. Griffiths
 Lino Bugeja (1983 – 1984)
 Joe Cilia (1985 – 1986)
 Andy Weavill (1993 – 1994)
 Zijad Švrakić (October 1994 – June 2001)
 Michael Molzahn (July 2009 – 11 June 2010)
 Silvio Vella (12 June 2010 – 28 May 2013)
 Steve D'Amato (17 August 2013 – 11 June 2014)
 Edward Azzopardi (6 June 2016 – )

External links
Rabat Ajax History
Rabat Ajax Team 2000/01
Rabat Ajax First Cup Final
Rabat Ajax Statistics
Official Rabat Ajax YouTube Channel
Official Facebook Page
New Rabat Ajax Board & Management - Jun 2021

 
Football clubs in Malta
1930 establishments in Malta
Association football clubs established in 1930